A nightclub act is a production, usually of nightclub music or comedy, designed for performance at a nightclub, a type of drinking establishment, by a nightclub performer such as a nightclub singer or nightclub dancer, whose performance may also be referred to as a nightclub act. A scheduled performance, such as a wedding gig, is a club date.

Acts may resemble revues and, "a good part of the music heard in nightclubs is standard popular song (jazz standards and the so-called Great American Songbook) and theater music repertoire...comedy songs, novelty songs, and the occasional torch song." "Cabaret, literally, is a subset of nightclub performance...In actual modern usage the terms 'nightclub' and 'cabaret' are virtually interchangeable."

The role of the female nightclub singer occurs frequently in fiction: books, movies, television, and even songs; she may serve as temptress, kidnapping or abuse victim, femme fatale, gangster moll, or as a prostitute. Due to censorship, a nightclub singer was often used to replace a prostitute character in film adaptations of books.

Nightclub acts were more common in the past, as modern nightclubs have moved towards dance music, DJs, and rave like environments. However, musicians such as David Bowie and Madonna have played nightclub singers in music videos and live performances. In New York City, since 1985, successful, enduring, or innovative cabaret acts have been honored by the annual Bistro Awards.

Performers
Notable nightclub performers include:

Performers at the 500 Club, one of the most popular nightclubs on the East Coast, included Frank Sinatra, Sammy Davis Jr., Martin and Lewis, the Will Mastin Trio, Jimmy Durante, Eartha Kitt, Sophie Tucker, the Jackie Paris Trio, Milton Berle, Nat King Cole, and Liberace, among many others.

See also
Broadway theatre
Dinner theater
Easy listening
Exotica
Go-go dancing
Stripper
Ziegfeld Follies

Notes

References

Fictional female musicians
Music by genre